The Lechang–Guangzhou Expressway, designated as G0423 and commonly abbreviated as Leguang Expressway is an expressway in Guangdong province, China linking the cities of Lechang and Guangzhou. This expressway is a branch of G4 Jinggang'ao Expressway. It was formerly called  S1 Guangle Expressway, then during the introduce of 71118 extension of NTHS, was numbered as G4W3 from 2013 to 2017.

Route

References

Expressways in Guangdong
0423